"Fairytales" is a song by Dutch Eurodance group 2 Brothers on the 4th Floor featuring rapper D-Rock and singer Des'Ray. It was released in 1996 as the third single from their second album, 2 (1996), reaching number four in the Netherlands, number 46 in Belgium and number 49 in Sweden. On the Eurochart Hot 100, the song peaked at number 85 in March 1996. Outside Europe, it peaked at number-one for one week in Israel.

Critical reception
Pan-European magazine Music & Media wrote, "Another possible smash hit from D-Rock and Des'Ray, backed by the Boer brothers. Radio-friendly dance from the Lowlands with a whiff of hardcore. The fast beats and spacey keyboards provide the backbone for the raps and vocals."

Music video
A computer generated music video was made for "Fairytales", directed by Ben Liebrand.

Track listing
 12", Netherlands (1996)
"Fairytales" (Extended Version) – 4:37
"Fairytales" (No Velocity Happy Hardcore Edit) – 3:30
"Fairytales" (Radio Version) – 3:29
"Fairytales" (Charly Lownoise & Mental Theo Hardcore Mix) – 4:36
"Fairytales" (DJ Weirdo & DJ Sim 1,2,3,4 Happy Remix) – 5:53
"Fairytales" (Charly Lownoise & Mental Theo Rave Edit) – 4:05

 CD single, Netherlands (1996)
"Fairytales" (Radio Version) – 3:29
"Fairytales" (Charly Lownoise & Mental Theo Rave Edit) – 4:05

 CD maxi, Netherlands (1996)
"Fairytales" (Radio Version) – 3:29
"Fairytales" (Charly Lownoise & Mental Theo Rave Edit) – 4:05
"Fairytales" (No Velocity Happy Hardcore Edit) – 3:30
"Fairytales" (Extended Version) – 4:37
"Fairytales" (Charly Lownoise & Mental Theo Hardcore Mix) – 4:36
"Fairytales" (DJ Weirdo & DJ Sim 1,2,3,4 Happy Remix) – 5:53

Charts

Weekly charts

Year-end charts

References

 

1996 singles
1996 songs
2 Brothers on the 4th Floor songs
CNR Music singles
Electro songs
English-language Dutch songs
Number-one singles in Israel